Lawrence Nunatak is a nunatak,  high, standing  west of Snake Ridge along the ice escarpment that trends southwest from the ridge, in the Patuxent Range of the Pensacola Mountains, Antarctica. It was mapped by the United States Geological Survey from surveys and U.S. Navy air photos, 1956–66, and was named by the Advisory Committee on Antarctic Names for Lawrence E. Brown, a surveyor at Palmer Station during the winter of 1966.

References

Nunataks of Queen Elizabeth Land